Vladimir Savićević (Serbian Cyrillic: Владимир Савићевић; born 12 May 1986) is a Serbian footballer who plays as a striker.

References

External links
 
 Vladimir Savićević stats at utakmica.rs 
 

Serbian footballers
Serbian SuperLiga players
Association football forwards
1986 births
Living people
Sportspeople from Kraljevo
FK Mladost Lučani players
FK Srem players
FK Metalac Gornji Milanovac players
FK Kolubara players
Serbian expatriate footballers
Serbian expatriate sportspeople in Austria
Expatriate footballers in Austria